Jimena or Ximena is the female version of the given name Jimeno, derived from the Basque Semen. It has come to be viewed as a form of the name Simone, though their origins are distinct.  The French rendering of the name is Chimène.  It may refer to:

Historical
Jimena, legendary mother of Bernardo del Carpio
Jimena of Cea, wife of king García Sánchez II of Pamplona (10th-/11th-century)
Jimena, daughter of Ramon Berenguer III (11th-century)
Jimena, daughter of Alfonso V of León (11th-century)
Jimena Díaz, wife of El Cid (11th-century)
Jimena Muñoz, mistress of Alfonso VI of León and Castile (11th-century)

Modern
Jimena Antelo (born 1972), Bolivian journalist and television presenter
Jimena (singer) (born 1980), Mexican singer
Jimena Canales, a Mexican-American physicist and author
Jimena Elías Roca (born 1989), Miss Peru Universo 2007
Jimena Florit (born 1972), Argentine mountain biker
María Jimena Piccolo (born 1985), Argentine TV actress
Chimène Badi (born 1982), French singer
Ximena Bellido (born 1966), Peruvian badminton player
Ximena Huilipán (born 1986), Chilean-Mapuche model and actress
Ximena Londoño (born 1958), Colombian botanist
Ximena McGlashan (1893 – 1986), American entomologist
Ximena Navarrete (born 1988), Mexican model, Miss Universe 2010
Ximena Sariñana (born 1985), Mexican singer and actress
Ximena García Lecuona, Mexican-American screenwriter

Others
JIMENA, Jews Indigenous to the Middle East and North Africa
Jimena de la Frontera
Jimena, Jaén, Spain
Hurricane Jimena (disambiguation)
Jimena, character in the Colombian soap opera Pasión de Gavilanes.
Jiménez dynasty, also called Jimena
Chimène, character in the Pierre Cornielle play, Le Cid, based on the historical Jimena Díaz
Chimène, character in the Massennet opera Le Cid (opera) based on Cornielle's Le CidChimène, a Sacchini opera inspired by Cornielle's Le Cid''
Rodrigue et Chimène, an unfinished Debussy opera based on El Cid and Jimena Díaz